Epixerus ebii wilsoni is a subspecies of the squirrel Epixerus ebii from Cameroon, Republic of the Congo, Equatorial Guinea, and Gabon. It has also been treated as a separate species. Its natural habitat is subtropical or tropical moist lowland forests. It is threatened by habitat loss.

References
 Grubb, P. 2004.  Epixerus wilsoni.   2006 IUCN Red List of Threatened Species.   Downloaded on 29 July 2007.
Thorington, R.W., Jr. and Hoffmann, R.S. 2005. Family Sciuridae. Pp. 754–818 in Wilson, D.E. and Reeder, D.M. (eds.). Mammal Species of the World: a taxonomic and geographic reference. 3rd ed. Baltimore: The Johns Hopkins University Press, 2 vols., 2142 pp. 

Epixerus
Mammals described in 1860
Taxonomy articles created by Polbot